Frederick Paul Fromm (born January 3, 1949) is a  Canadian former high school teacher, white supremacist, neo-Nazi, and perennial political candidate. 

Fromm is the international director of the white supremacist organization Council of Conservative Citizens and is the director of several far-right groups in Canada, most notably the Canadian Association for Free Expression, Citizens for Foreign Aid Reform and the Canada First Immigration Reform Committee.

He has hosted a radio show on the Stormfront web site and has ties to former Ku Klux Klan members David Duke, Don Black, and Mark Martin, a white supremacist rally organizer in Covington, Ohio. The National Post newspaper described him as "one of Canada's most notorious white supremacists".

Since 2018, he has been based in Hamilton, Ontario, but he previously lived in Mississauga, Ontario, outside of Toronto, since the 1970s.

Family
Fromm was born in Bogotá, Colombia to Canadian parents, and grew up in Etobicoke in a devout Catholic family. His mother, Marguerite Michaud, was of French Canadian descent, while his father, Frederick William Fromm, was of German and Irish descent. His father enlisted in the Royal Canadian Navy during World War II. After the war, he qualified as a chartered accountant and worked in Colombia for an oil company. After Fromm was born, the family returned to Ontario where his father found work as an accountant with the provincial Department of Highways.

Teaching career

Fromm began teaching at Applewood Heights Secondary School in 1973. During a public meeting on race relations in 1991, he said "scalp them", while activist Rodney Bobiwash of the Native Canadian Centre was speaking. The Canadian Jewish Congress and community and race relations committee chair Art Eggleton called for review of his employment; the Native Canadian Centre of Toronto called for his dismissal. Fromm said his remark was misinterpreted, and claimed to leave his politics out of the classroom.

Fromm's 1990 speech to the Western Guard was shown to the Peel District School Board in 1992, prompting the board to ask the province to review Fromm's contract, warn Fromm to end his involvement with racist organizations, and urge the Ontario Teachers' Federation to establish guidelines of teachers. The OTF replied that such guidelines existed in the Teaching Profession Act, and contesting that it was up to the board to pursue. The board asked the Ontario Ministry of Education to review his teaching certificate.

In June 1993, it was announced that Fromm would be reassigned to teaching adult education, "the best option legally available to the board." The school board chair suggested adults would be more likely to act on inappropriate behaviour, than high school students.

White supremacist activities
Fromm was an admirer of Fidel Castro in the early 1960s, but changed his views after coming across the writings of Barry Goldwater.

In 1967, as a student at the University of Toronto's St. Michael's College, Fromm co-founded the Edmund Burke Society (EBS), with Don Andrews and Leigh Smith, as well as its student wing "Campus Alternative". The Edmund Burke Society was a right-wing anti-communist group that agitated against prominent left-wing movements. The group would often disrupt left-wing rallies and events, sometimes violently. The group's main focus was opposition to the New Left and other left-wing tendencies that the Society  associated with communism. In 1970, the group disrupted a speech by left-wing radical lawyer, William Kunstler, with Fromm climbing on stage and pouring a glass of water on Kunstler's lecture notes, resulting in the Chicago Seven's lawyer drenching Fromm with a pitcher of water. A melee between EBS members and Kunstler's supporters ensued, and Fromm was knocked to the floor unconscious.

With the support of members of the Edmund Burke Society, Fromm was elected president of the Ontario Social Credit Party in 1971, and was able to have other EBS members elected to the party's executive. Three Social Credit candidates in the 1971 Ontario election were avowed "Burkers".

As the New Left movement waned, Edmund Burke Society members turned their attention to issues of race and immigration and became increasingly attracted to white supremacist ideas. In February 1972, the group renamed itself the Western Guard. In 1972, after having lost the Social Credit Party presidency to James McGillvray, Fromm led a successful attempt by the Western Guard to take over the Ontario wing of the Social Credit Party of Canada. The national executive of the national Social Credit Party declared membership in the Western Guard "incompatible" with membership in the party, which led national Social Credit leader Réal Caouette to place the Ontario organization under trusteeship in order to counter Fromm's activities.

In May 1972, Fromm was the opening speaker at a Western Guard banquet honouring Robert E. Miles, a former Ku Klux Klan leader who became a leading ideologue in the Christian Identity movement.  Fromm, Overfield and several others resigned from the Western Guard in May 1972, immediately after the Toronto Sun published an article on the group, which included information about the banquet. Fromm's departure left the leadership of the Western Guard in the hands of Don Andrews. Fromm claimed in a 1973 letter to the Toronto Star that he left the Western Guard "because of a growing radicalization of its politics and the irresponsibility of some of its activities". Later, he denied ever having been a member of the Guard, saying he "never had any connection" with the organization. When confronted with his 1973 letter, he dismissed it as "a matter of semantics".

On August 4, 2008, Fox News interviewed Fromm in relation to the prosecution of right-wing Canadian author Mark Steyn. The Southern Poverty Law Center criticised Fox for identifying Fromm only as a "Free Speech Activist".

In 2010, Fromm organized small protests across the country against the admission of a group of Tamil refugees arriving on the MV Sun Sea. In August he led a small protest in Calgary with members of the Aryan Guard outside of Immigration Minister Jason Kenney's constituency office which "so terrified the receptionist that she locked the door and would not accept Mr. Fromm's delivery of a letter until police arrived". He also organized a small protest with Doug Christie in Esquimalt, British Columbia, where the boat was docked and also led small pickets later in the month in Ottawa and Hamilton.

Mainstream and electoral politics
Fromm graduated from university with a master's degree in English and an education degree. He worked as a school teacher with the Peel Region Board of Education from 1974 until his dismissal in 1997. He temporarily tried to distance himself from groups that were visibly linked to explicitly racist and neo-Nazi beliefs. He founded Countdown, which led to the creation of three organizations that attempted to make far-right views palatable to the mainstream. Fromm was elected as a Catholic school trustee in 1976, after an unsuccessful attempt in 1974, and served on the Metro Toronto Separate School Board until he was defeated in his bid for re-election two years later. His father, Fred, was also defeated in his 1978 bid for a seat on the board.

In 1976, Fromm founded the Citizens for Foreign Aid Reform (C-FAR), which opposes foreign aid to Third World nations. The organization also deals with other issues, including crime and punishment, multiculturalism and immigration. It sponsors lectures by far-right individuals, and publishes pamphlets and books, mostly about race and immigration. In 1981, Fromm founded Canadian Association for Free Expression (CAFE), in opposition to the Canadian Human Rights Commission. CAFE has been active defending the rights of accused antisemites, racists and Holocaust deniers against prosecution under hate crime and human rights legislation. Another group he founded was Canada First Immigration Reform Committee,  which advocates reduced immigration, and opposes immigration by non-whites. These three groups still exist today and are still led by Fromm. Their membership and mandates overlap, and they are essentially a single organization. Fromm's leadership of these groups has given him some access to the mainstream media, such as radio talk shows and newspapers.

In the late 1970s, Fromm also founded Canadian Friends of Rhodesia to support the white minority rule regime of Ian Smith and his Rhodesian Front. In the mid to late 1980s, Fromm's organizations were involved in advocacy on behalf of South Africa's apartheid regime, and opposing the movement to impose economic sanctions on the country.

Fromm attempted to enter mainstream political activity by joining the Progressive Conservative Party of Canada. He was elected treasurer of PC Metro, a network of 31 Toronto PC riding associations on April 15, 1981. He angered many people and embarrassed both the federal and Ontario Progressive Conservatives when a profile in The Globe and Mail quoted him as saying that breeding a "supreme race" for intelligence was a good idea, and as calling for Vietnamese refugees to be sent to "desert islands" off the Philippines and Indonesia rather than be accepted into Canada where they would "upset the racial balance". His comments resulted in Progressive Conservative premier Bill Davis being asked in the legislature whether he is willing "to tolerate such neo-fascist, if not fascist, ideas within the Conservative Party". Federal Progressive Conservative immigration critic Chris Speyer said Fromm's remarks were "entirely his and certainly don't represent the views of the party or the caucus". Federal PC president Peter Blaikie asked Fromm to resign from the local executive, telling the press on April 30, 1981: "It's quite clear that that article, accurate or inaccurate, sets out a position which is clearly at variance with that of the party", and that the issue "has created some difficulty and embarrassment for the party".

In 1983, Fromm was an active supporter of right-wing Member of Parliament John A. Gamble's unsuccessful bid to win the leadership of the federal Progressive Conservatives. Fromm's work with Gamble continued beyond his unsuccessful leadership bid, and included work in the World Anti-Communist League. In 1993, Gamble was rejected as a candidate for the Reform Party of Canada because of his long association with Fromm and other racist activists.

In the late 1980s, Fromm was an active member of the Reform Party, but was essentially expelled in October 1988 when leader Preston Manning sent Fromm a letter asking him to "dissociate" himself from the party, following complaints by party members about the racist tenor of a speech Fromm made at a Reform Party gathering. In the 1988 federal election, Fromm ran as a candidate for the Confederation of Regions Party in the riding of Mississauga East, and received 288 votes.

In 1997, Fromm was a candidate for the public school board in Peel Region. He received 827 votes (10.39% of ballots cast), coming in last of four candidates.

Fromm was a candidate for mayor of Mississauga, Ontario in the October 25, 2010, municipal election, running on an anti-immigration platform. Fromm reportedly made racist and homophobic comments during his campaign and displayed white supremacist and Holocaust denial literature at his campaign tables. He claimed that train stations in the city looked "like flippin' Calcutta" and that the city had been "paved over with ticky tacky houses that are mostly filled with East Indians" and is also quoted as saying "I wake up in the morning and I feel great. I'm high on hate". On election day, Fromm came in ninth in a field of 17 with 917 votes which represented 0.65% of the total vote. Fromm again ran for Mayor of Mississauga in 2014 receiving 775 votes (0.48%) and coming in 10th in a field of 15.

In the 2011 federal election, Fromm stood in Calgary Southeast as the candidate of the far right Western Block Party against immigration minister Jason Kenney, on a platform advocating a freeze in immigration. Kenney was re-elected, winning over 76% of the vote, while Fromm received 193 votes, around 0.3%.

In 2016, Fromm attempted to join the Conservative Party of Canada in order to support the leadership campaign of Kellie Leitch due to her support for immigration reform and a "Canadian values" test for prospective immigrants. Leitch's campaign co-chair Sander Grieve wrote back to Fromm, saying: "We have not processed your membership and we will not be submitting it to the party, as we believe your public statements are not consistent with the principles of the party or the policies being advanced by our campaign."

Fromm endorsed socially conservative candidate Tanya Granic Allen in the 2018 Progressive Conservative Party of Ontario leadership election. Although she did not respond when originally asked for comment by the Toronto Star, Granic Allen later publicly stated on Twitter that she rejects his endorsement with the statement: "No place in our party for white supremacists."

Fromm was a candidate for the Canadians' Choice Party in Etobicoke Centre during the 2018 Ontario general election, receiving 631 votes (1.1%).

Fromm moved to Hamilton, Ontario in 2018, after having lived in Mississauga for several decades, and registered as a candidate for Mayor of Hamilton in the October 2018 municipal election. Fromm came in 7th in a field of 15 with 706 votes which represented 0.51% of the total vote.

In July 2019, Fromm posed for a photo with Maxime Bernier, party leader of the People's Party of Canada.  He later endorsed Bernier on Twitter, writing that Bernier had "both the charisma and determination to put CANADA FIRST,"  and praising the former Conservative leadership contender's immigration policies as steps toward "regaining control" of Canada’s border.

Links to other prominent fascists and racists

In the 1990s, Fromm spoke at several Heritage Front events, including a celebration of Adolf Hitler's birthday.  A video surfaced of him addressing the rally and referring to Canadian fascist John Ross Taylor as a "hero". Taylor was one of two Canadian Nazis interned by the government during World War II. The video shows Fromm standing beside a Nazi flag during the Heritage Front's "Martyr's Day". The rally included shouts from the audience of "Sieg Heil!", "white power", "Hail The Order!" and "nigger, nigger, nigger, out out out". Fromm, a high school English teacher at the time, was reprimanded by the school board after videos of him speaking at white supremacist rallies came to light in 1992. He was transferred to an adult education centre by the board in 1993 pending the outcome of an investigation into his activities and then fired by the school board in 1997.

In 2000, a published report alleged that developer Martin Weiche, a former leader of the Canadian Nazi Party, was one of Fromm's major financial backers. Fromm organized rallies in support of Holocaust denier Ernst Zündel and has shared a stage with David Irving, another individual active in the same denialist movement. B'nai B'rith legal counsel Anita Bromberg has said "Fromm is the one who has put himself out there most directly as supporting Zündel. He looks as though he's waiting in the wings." In 2004, Fromm was associated with David Duke's efforts to unite white nationalists with the New Orleans Protocol. In the 2000s, he has tried to revive the display of the Canadian Red Ensign flag.

In January 2005, Fromm defended himself at a disciplinary hearing of the Ontario College of Teachers against charges including "failure to maintain professional standards; not complying with college regulations and bylaws; disgraceful, dishonourable, unprofessional and/or unbecoming conduct; and practising while in a conflict of interest."  Following three days of hearings, further deliberations were postponed. The hearing resumed in the spring of 2007 and on October 31, 2007, the college rendered its ruling stripping Fromm of his licence to teach in the province of Ontario.

Fromm has acted as an advocate for far-right activists who have been called before the Canadian Human Rights Tribunal (CHRT). Among those Fromm has represented are Glenn Bahr, the co-founder and former leader of Western Canada for Us, and Terry Tremaine, a former University of Saskatchewan mathematics lecturer. In 2006, he represented the Canadian Heritage Alliance at a CHRT hearing in Toronto, and supported John Beck of the group BC White Pride at a CHRT hearing in Penticton, British Columbia.
Fromm has been described as a mentor to younger "far-right extremists" such as Melissa Guille and Jason Ouwendyk and as a "'senior player' in the neo-Nazi movement in Canada." He identifies himself as an advocate for "white nationalists".

Fromm has repeatedly spoken at events sponsored by Thomas Robb's Ku Klux Klan faction, the Knights Party.  In 2007, he was a keynote speaker at the group's White Christian Revival gathering.

On March 21, 2009, Fromm participated in a "White Pride" march organized by the Aryan Guard, a neo-Nazi gang in Calgary, Alberta.

In March 2018, Fromm was being investigated by the hate crimes unit of the Hamilton police, after posting on his website The Great Replacement, the white supremacist manifesto of Australian Brenton Harrison Tarrant, the terrorist who killed 51 people and injured 50 more at Al Noor Mosque and Linwood Islamic Centre in Christchurch, New Zealand, in the Christchurch mosque shootings. Fromm described the manifesto as "cogent" and said violence was "not the way to go, but our vile elites have made it all but inevitable."

Opposition
Fromm's "Alternative Forum" meetings have been the targets of demonstrations, and have been disrupted and occasionally shut down by protesters.

On August 19, 2006, dozens of anti-fascist youths surrounded Fromm's Port Credit, Ontario townhouse, challenging Fromm to come outside.  Although he reportedly remained inside, approximately half a dozen neo-Nazis were present outside his home. Over 50 police officers were on call to protect Fromm and his supporters. The area was plastered in flyers advertising Fromm's home address and far-right political affiliations. The protest ended without incident.

On his way to an April 19, 2007, Ontario College of Teachers hearing into his conduct, Fromm was involved in a scuffle with Jewish Defense League (JDL) members in an elevator. Protesters claimed that Fromm shoved them, but Fromm asserts that the JDL members lunged at him. Police arrested two protesters, charging them with assault, assaulting police, and obstructing.

In October 2007, the House of Commons of Canada unanimously passed a resolution banning Fromm and Alexan Kulbashian from the Parliament of Canada buildings after they attempted to hold a press conference in the parliamentary press theatre. The resolution read: "That this House order that Alexan Kulbashian and Paul Fromm be denied admittance to the precincts of the House of Commons during the present session to preserve the dignity and integrity of the House".

In 2015, Fromm said in an interview posted on YouTube that he was denied entry into the United States by the Department of Homeland Security.

Libel case
Fromm and his Canadian Association for Free Expression were sued by Ottawa lawyer Richard Warman for libelling the anti-racist activist in various online posts. On November 23, 2007, Ontario Superior Court Justice Monique Métivier ruled in Warman's favour, ordering Fromm to pay Warman a total of $30,000 in damages and to post full retractions on all the websites on which he posted the defamatory comments within 10 days. Métivier found that Fromm posted statements about Warman "either knowing the fundamental falseness of the accusations he levelled at Mr. Warman, or being reckless as to the truth of these". Métivier added that "The steady diet of diatribe and insults, couched in half-truths and omissions, all lead up to the finding of malice such that the defamatory statements are not protected by the defence of fair comment".

On December 15, 2008, the Ontario Court of Appeal upheld the original $30,000 defamation judgment against Fromm and added a $10,000 penalty in legal costs. Fromm posted a financial appeal complaining, "We are $17,500 behind in our legal bills – to say nothing of the possible $40,000 debt, if this judgment stands". Richard Warman responded to news of the appeal court's ruling by saying it "sends the message that those who try to use the cloak of free speech to poison other people's reputations through lies and defamation do so at their own peril".

The Supreme Court of Canada rejected Fromm's application to appeal the judgement on April 23, 2009.

Electoral record

|-
!rowspan="2" colspan="2" |Candidate
!colspan="3" |Popular vote
!rowspan="2" colspan="2" |Expenditures
|-
! Votes
! %
! ±%
|-
| style="background-color:#66023C;" |
| style="text-align:left;" | Fred Eisenberger (Incumbent)
| style="text-align:centre;" | 74,093
| style="text-align:centre;" | 54.03%
| style="text-align:centre;" | +14.1%
| style="text-align:centre;" |
|-
| style="background-color:#1406a8;" |
| style="text-align:left;" | Vito Sgro
| style="text-align:centre;" | 52,190
| style="text-align:centre;" | 38.06%
| style="text-align:centre;" | n/a
| style="text-align:centre;" |
|-
| style="background-color:#b1e85f;" |
| style="text-align:left;" | George Rusich
| style="text-align:centre;" | 2,220
| style="text-align:centre;" | 1.62%
| style="text-align:centre;" | n/a
| style="text-align:centre;" |
|-
| style="background-color:#fdff91;" |
| style="text-align:left;" | Jim Davis
| style="text-align:centre;" | 2,071
| style="text-align:centre;" | 1.51%
| style="text-align:centre;" | n/a
| style="text-align:centre;" |
|-
| style="background-color:#E30022;" |
| style="text-align:left;" | Nathalie Xian Yi Yan
| style="text-align:centre;" | 1,286
| style="text-align:centre;" | 0.94%
| style="text-align:centre;" | n/a
| style="text-align:centre;" |
|-
| style="background-color:#f44262;" |
| style="text-align:left;" | Michael Pattison
| style="text-align:centre;" | 899
| style="text-align:centre;" | 0.66%
| style="text-align:centre;" | +0.04
| style="text-align:centre;" |
|-
| style="background-color:#65AFF6;" |
| style="text-align:left;" | Paul Fromm
| style="text-align:centre;" | 706
| style="text-align:centre;" | 0.51%
| style="text-align:centre;" | n/a
| style="text-align:centre;" |
|-
| style="background-color:#efffaf;" |
| style="text-align:left;" | Carlos Gomes
| style="text-align:centre;" | 521
| style="text-align:centre;" | 0.38%
| style="text-align:centre;" | n/a
| style="text-align:centre;" |
|-
| style="background-color:#a3c3f7;" |
| style="text-align:left;" | Todd May
| style="text-align:centre;" | 500
| style="text-align:centre;" | 0.36%
| style="text-align:centre;" | n/a
| style="text-align:centre;" |
|-
| style="background-color:#f44289;" |
| style="text-align:left;" | Henry Geissler
| style="text-align:centre;" | 494 
| style="text-align:centre;" | 0.36%
| style="text-align:centre;" | n/a
| style="text-align:centre;" |
|-
| style="background-color:#7ff9b0;" |
| style="text-align:left;" | Phil Ryerson
| style="text-align:centre;" | 479
| style="text-align:centre;" | 0.35%
| style="text-align:centre;" | +0.13%
| style="text-align:centre;" |
|-
| style="background-color:#019b10;" |
| style="text-align:left;" | Ute Schmid-Jones
| style="text-align:centre;" | 463
| style="text-align:centre;" | 0.34%
| style="text-align:centre;" | n/a
| style="text-align:centre;" |
|-
| style="background-color:#4A4B4C;" |
| style="text-align:left;" | Edward Graydon
| style="text-align:centre;" | 409
| style="text-align:centre;" | 0.30%
| style="text-align:centre;" | n/a
| style="text-align:centre;" |
|-
| style="background-color:#8DB600"|
| style="text-align:left;" | Mark Wozny
| style="text-align:centre;" | 408
| style="text-align:centre;" | 0.30%
| style="text-align:centre;" | n/a
| style="text-align:centre;" |
|-
| style="background-color:#ffe69e;" |
| style="text-align:left;" | Ricky Tavares
| style="text-align:centre;" | 398
| style="text-align:centre;" | 0.29%
| style="text-align:centre;" | -0.06%
| style="text-align:centre;" |
|-
| style="text-align:right;background-color:#FFFFFF;" colspan="2" |Total votes
| style="text-align:right;background-color:#FFFFFF;" |138,549
| style="text-align:right;background-color:#FFFFFF;" | 38.36%
| style="text-align:right;background-color:#FFFFFF;" | +4.3%
| style="text-align:right;" |
|- 
| style="text-align:right;background-color:#FFFFFF;" colspan="2" |Registered voters
| style="text-align:right;background-color:#FFFFFF;" | 361,212
| style="text-align:right;background-color:#FFFFFF;" | 100%
| style="text-align:right;background-color:#FFFFFF;" | n/a
| style="text-align:right;" | 
|- 
| style="text-align:left;" colspan="6" |Note: All Hamilton Municipal Elections are officially non-partisan.  Note: Candidate campaign colours are based on the prominent colour used in campaign items (signs, literature, etc.)and are used as a visual differentiation between candidates.
|- 
| style="text-align:left;" colspan="13" |Sources: City of Hamilton, "Nominated Candidates" 
|}

|-
! style="background:#ddf; width:400px;"| Candidate 
! style="background:#ddf; width:50px;"| Vote
! style="background:#ddf; width:30px;"| %
|-
| Bonnie Crombie || 102,346 || 63.49 
|-
| Steve Mahoney || 46,224 || 28.68
|-
| Dil Muhammad || 2,429 || 1.51
|-
| Stephen King || 1,874 || 1.16 
|-
| Masood Khan || 1,254 || 0.78 
|-
| Donald Barber || 1,225 || 0.76  
|-
| Derek Ramkissoon || 1,044 || 0.65
|-
| Scott E. W. Chapman || 868 || 0.54
|-
| Riazuddin Choudhry || 790 || 0.49  
|-
| Paul Fromm || 775 || 0.48  
|-
| Kevin Jackal Johnston || 741 || 0.46  
|-
| Andrew Seitz || 507 || 0.31  
|-
| Joe Lomangino || 415 || 0.26  
|-
| Grant Isaac || 392 || 0.24 
|-
| Sheraz Siddiqui || 315 || 0.20 
|}

|-
! style="background:#ddf; width:200px;"| Candidate 
! style="background:#ddf; width:50px;"| Vote
! style="background:#ddf; width:30px;"| %
|-
|Hazel McCallion (X)|| 107,643 || 76.40
|-
|Dave Cook|| 10,744 || 7.63
|-
|George Winter || 4,783 || 3.39
|-
|Ranjit Chahal || 4,199 || 2.98
|-
|Ghani Ahsan|| 3,744 || 2.66
|-
|Ram Selvarajah || 2,241 || 1.59
|-
|Peter Orphanos || 2,140 || 1.52 
|-
|Donald Barber|| 1,513 || 1.07
|-
|Paul Fromm||917|| 0.65
|-
|Martin Marinka|| 644 || 0.46
|-
|Bryan Robert Hallett|| 575 || 0.41
|-
|Shirley Vanden Berg || 516 || 0.37
|-
|Ursula Keuper-Bennett|| 329 || 0.23
|-
|Andy Valenton|| 293 || 0.21
|-
|Antu Maprani Chakkunny || 249 || 0.18
|-
|Andrew Seitz|| 233 || 0.17
|-
|Innocent Watat || 139 || 0.10
|}
Public School Trustee, Peel Board of Education, November 10, 1997 municipal election
Mississauga Wards 1 & 7
Janet McDougald 2,862 (32%)
Joan Parker 2,332 (29%)
Gail Green 1,938 (24%)
Paul Fromm 827 (10%)

|-
  
|Liberal
|GUARNIERI, Albina  
|align="right"|23,055 
  
|Progressive Conservative
|PALLETT, Laurie  
|align="right"| 20,963
 
|New Democratic Party
|GROZDANOVSKI, Walter  
|align="right"|5,677

 
|Independent
| DI PALMA, Adel  
|align="right"|189

|}
Metropolitan Toronto Separate (Catholic) School Board Trustee, November 13, 1978 municipal election
Metro Ward 11 (314 out of 335 polls reporting)
Francis Hogan 2,814
Paul Fromm 1,813
Joyce Frustaglio 1,762

Metropolitan Toronto Separate (Catholic) School Board Trustee, December 6, 1976 municipal election
Area 11
Paul Fromm 2,515
Ed Webster 1,903

Metropolitan Toronto Separate (Catholic) School Board Trustee, December 2, 1974 municipal election
Area 11
Ed Webster 1,502
F. Paul Fromm 1,168
Gerry McGilly 1,136

See also
Ron Gostick
Bernard Klatt

References

External links
Canadian Association for Free Expression
ARA article on Paul Fromm 
One People's Project on Paul Fromm
Canada First Immigration Reform Committee – Canadian Political Parties and Political Interest Groups – Web Archive created by the University of Toronto Libraries

1949 births
Alt-right politicians in Canada
Anti-Masonry
Canadian people of German descent
Canadian activists
Canadian anti-communists
Canadian Holocaust deniers
Canadian neo-Nazis
University of Toronto alumni
Confederation of Regions Party of Canada candidates in the 1988 Canadian federal election
Living people
Politicians from Toronto
Politicians from Hamilton, Ontario
Canadian social crediters
People from Bogotá
Council of Conservative Citizens
Western Canadian separatists
People from Etobicoke
Far-right politics in Canada